Hassan Raza Khan Bareilwi was an Indian islamic scholar, sufi and poet and the younger brother of Imam Ahmed Raza Khan, the main leader of the Ahle Sunnat movement. He was a disciple of Sha Ale Rasool Marehrvi in to Sufism, revered Sufi master from Marehra, Etah, Uttar Pradesh. He was a disciple of Dagh Dehlvi, a learned poet from Delhi. Hasrat Mohani praised Hassan Raza Khan's poetic greatness.

Birth and family
Hassan Raza was born in 1859 (Rabi' al-awwal 1276 Hijri), in Bareilly, India. His name at the time of his aqeeqah was Muhammad, as it was family tradition.

Lineage

Khan was the brother of Ahmad Raza Khan, the son of Naqi Ali Khan, the son of Raza Ali Khan.

Poetry works
He has written following books. 
His famous book of poetry is Zauq-e-Naat.
Ayina e Qayamat
Rasayel e Hassan
Qitat e Ashar o Ahsan
Samar Fasahat
Qand Parsi
Samamam Hasan Baradbar fitan
Wasaail Bakhshish
Zoq e Naat- Naatia Kalam
Kuliyat e Hassan

Death
Khan died on 3rd Shawwal 1326 Hijri in the year 1908. Aala Hazrat Ahmed Raza Khan performed his Janazah prayer and lowered him in qabar shareef with his blessed hands. His mazār Shareef is in City Graveyard Bareilly Shareef Beside his mother Mazaar Shareef.

His great grandson, Maulana Kaif Raza Khan, is the Sajjada Nashin chairman of the governing body of Dargah-e-Ustad e Zaman, the shrine of Hassan Raza Khan.

See also
 Ahmed Raza Khan
 Mustafa Raza Khan
 Hamid Raza Khan
 Naqi Ali Khan
 Maulana Kaif Raza Khan

References

Ahmed Raza Khan Barelvi
Ahmed
Barelvi
Barelvis
Indian Sufis
Sunni imams
Hanafi fiqh scholars
Hanafis
Maturidis
Indian Sunni Muslim scholars of Islam
Writers in British India
Indian male poets
Poets in British India
Poets from Uttar Pradesh
Muslim reformers
Scholars from Uttar Pradesh
People from Bareilly
People from Bareilly district
19th-century Indian poets
20th-century Indian poets
20th-century Muslim scholars of Islam
Indian Sunni Muslims
Indian people of Pashtun descent
Barech

1859 births
1908 deaths